Statistics of Allsvenskan in season 1955/1956.

Overview
The league was contested by 12 teams, with IFK Norrköping winning the championship.

League table

Results

Footnotes

References 

Allsvenskan seasons
1955–56 in Swedish association football leagues
Sweden